The St. Johns River Water Management District ("SJRWMD") is one of five Florida water management districts that is responsible for managing groundwater and surface water resources in Florida. SJRWMD covers an 18-county region in northeast and east-central Florida.

It employs approximately 600 people at offices in Palatka, Jacksonville, Maitland, and Palm Bay. The district's headquarters is located in Palatka.

The budget for 2013-14 is $135.5 million.

History
SJRWMD is one of five water management districts that were established in 1972 by Chapter 373, Florida Statutes, as independent special districts, and were empowered by the electorate in 1976 to assess ad valorem taxes to fund the management of the state’s water and related land resources, to benefit people and the environment. Each water management district is administered by a Governing Board composed of residents appointed by the Governor and approved by the Florida Senate. All districts report directly to the governor.

In 2013, the District lost a case before the U.S. Supreme court in Koontz v. St. Johns River Water Management District.

Area of Jurisdiction
The counties which are entirely within SJRWMD are: Brevard, Clay, Duval, Flagler, Indian River, Lake, Marion, Nassau, St. Johns, Seminole, Putnam, and Volusia. Partial counties include: Alachua, Baker, Bradford, Okeechobee, Orange, and Osceola. SJRWMD covers 12,283 square miles (31,813 km²), or 23 percent of Florida. , 4.73 million people (about 21 percent of the state’s population) made their home in SJRWMD.

The major river within SJRWMD is the St. Johns River. The two major tributaries are the Econlockhatchee River and the Ocklawaha River. Other major waterways are the St. Marys River, which serves as the boundary between Florida and Georgia; and the Nassau, Ocklawaha, Matanzas, Halifax, and Indian rivers. SJRWMD contains 96 springs and more than 1,400 lakes.

See also
Northwest Florida Water Management District
South Florida Water Management District
Southwest Florida Water Management District
Suwannee River Water Management District

References

External links
 
 relevant topics currently in the news or recently in the news

Water management authorities in the United States
State agencies of Florida
 
1972 establishments in Florida
Government agencies established in 1972
Organizations based in Putnam County, Florida
Palatka, Florida